Eupithecia magica is a moth in the family Geometridae. It is endemic to south-western China (Tibet).

The forewings are pale brownish grey and the hindwings are slightly paler.

References

External links

Moths described in 2006
Endemic fauna of Tibet
Moths of Asia
magica